Terpestacin is a fungal metabolite with anticancer activity.

References

External links

Cancer treatments